Barnes is a small town in the far central south part of the Riverina and situated about  north of Moama and  north of Echuca.

Because of geography, it is in the sphere of influence of the adjoining state of Victoria, which explains why its railway connection goes to Victoria.

Barnes Post Office opened on 1 January 1928 and closed in 1972.

Notes

External links 
 Barnes Rail Siding
 Barnes Rail Junction

Towns in the Riverina
Towns in New South Wales
Murray River Council